Aramil is the name of several inhabited localities in Sysertsky District of Sverdlovsk Oblast, Russia.

Urban localities
Aramil, a town

Rural localities
Aramil (rural locality), a settlement